, a.k.a. ; (born May 15, 1960), is a Japanese actress especially known for her roles in pink film.

Izumi made her pink film debut in October 1980 in  produced  by Shishi Pro and released by Toei. In the next four years, Aki appeared in about sixty pink films primarily for the Shintōhō Eiga and Million Film studios. In November 1981, she had a role in actress Rumi Tama's debut as a director in the pink film  distributed by Million Film. Aki starred in two low-budget films directed by Hiroki Hirakawa, the August 1982  and the April 1983 production  for Million Film.

In one of her last pink film roles, in February 1985, she played opposite actor and director Yutaka Ikejima in another Million Film production .

After marrying the film director Kazuyoshi Sekine her pink film acting career seemed to have ended. Izumi later returned to the screen in 1999, starring in Hatsujō midare zuma (発情乱れ妻).

References

External links

JMDb profile (in Japanese)

1960 births
Living people
Japanese actresses
Japanese female adult models
Pink film actors